Froebel Deportes is a Peruvian football club, playing in the city of Ayacucho, Peru.

History
In the 2009 Copa Perú, Froebel Deportes was champion of the Region VI when defeated to Deportivo Municipal de Huamanga, and the club advanced to the National Stage where was eliminated by León de Huánuco.

Honours

National
Región VI: 1
Winners (1): 2009

Liga Departamental de Ayacucho: 1
Winners (1): 2010
 Runner-up (2): 2007, 2009

Liga Superior de Ayacucho: 0
 Runner-up (1): 2009

See also
List of football clubs in Peru
Peruvian football league system

External links
 Froebel Deportes Club: Entró por la ventana
 Soccer way - Froebedel Deportes Club

Football clubs in Peru
Association football clubs established in 2003